Gryan Miers (born 30 March 1999) is an Australian rules footballer playing for  in the Australian Football League (AFL). A small forward, he played in the TAC Cup before he was recruited by Geelong with pick 57 in the 2017 national draft. Miers debuted in the opening round of the 2019 season and was nominated for the AFL Rising Star award in round 8.

Junior career 
Miers played junior football for St Mary's and Grovedale before representing the Geelong Falcons in the TAC Cup. In their victorious 2017 season, he kicked a league-high 50 goals, including a haul of seven in the grand final against the Sandringham Dragons, when he was named best on ground. Miers was also named in the competition's team of the year, averaging 17 disposals and four tackles from his 17 matches. He represented Vic Country in four matches at the 2017 AFL Under 18 Championships as a midfielder, averaging 18 disposals and five marks.

Miers' agility, pressure and crumbing ability were strengths in his junior career, but his kicking was identified as a deficiency. He was named as "one of AFL's next big cult heroes" by Fox Sports for his dreadlocks, unusual name, football ability and confidence in important matches. Miers was predicted to be drafted in the second or third rounds of the 2017 AFL national draft by ESPN, and in "second-round — possible first-round — calculations" by Fox Sports.

AFL career 
Miers was selected by Geelong with pick 57 in the 2017 national draft. He spent his first season in the Victorian Football League (VFL), playing all 20 matches and averaging one goal per game. In 2019, Miers debuted in the opening round of the season against . He was nominated for the AFL Rising Star award in round 8, after amassing 22 possessions and kicking one goal against ; up to that point he had played every match. An analysis by AFL.com.au reporter Callum Twomey identified him as a "key factor in the Cats' place atop the ladder", along with fellow recruit Luke Dahlhaus. In June, Miers signed a contract extension with Geelong to the end of 2021.

Statistics
Updated to the end of the 2022 season.

|-
| 2019 ||  || 32
| 25 || 28 || 19 || 229 || 156 || 385 || 98 || 48 || 1.1 || 0.8 || 9.2 || 6.2 || 15.4 || 3.9 || 1.9 || 0
|-
| 2020 ||  || 32
| 21 || 19 || 6 || 188 || 97 || 285 || 93 || 33 || 0.9 || 0.3 || 9.0 || 4.6 || 13.6 || 4.4 || 1.6 || 3
|-
| 2021 ||  || 32
| 15 || 12 || 7 || 130 || 102 || 232 || 58 || 23 || 0.8 || 0.5 || 8.7 || 6.8 || 15.5 || 3.9 || 1.5 || 0
|-
| scope=row bgcolor=F0E68C | 2022# ||  || 32
| 22 || 13 || 13 || 174 || 153 || 327 || 80 || 47 || 0.6 || 0.6 || 7.9 || 7.0 || 14.9 || 3.6 || 2.1 || 0
|- class=sortbottom
! colspan=3 | Career
! 83 !! 72 !! 45 !! 721 !! 508 !! 1229 !! 329 !! 151 !! 0.9 !! 0.5 !! 8.7 !! 6.1 !! 14.8 !! 4.0 !! 1.8 !! 3
|}

Notes

Honours and achievements
Team
 AFL premiership player: 2022
 2× McClelland Trophy: 2019, 2022

Individual
 22under22 team: 2020
 Geelong F.C. Best Young Player Award: 2019
 AFL Rising Star nominee: 2019 (round 8)

Personal life 
During his childhood, Miers supported the Brisbane Lions. His father, David Miers, is a biomechanist who was listed with Collingwood in the 1980s and founded XBlades, a footwear company.

References

External links 

Living people
1999 births
Australian rules footballers from Victoria (Australia)
Geelong Football Club players
Geelong Football Club Premiership players
Geelong Falcons players
One-time VFL/AFL Premiership players